Kolashanpan is a carbonated beverage created by Embotelladora La Cascada S.A. It comes in either a glass bottle, plastic bottle, and a can, the most prominent of these is plastic.  On their company webpage the sizes go from a small bottle of 6.5 ounces to a 3 liter bottle, at least for the ones bottled in plastic.. According to the company, the main ingredients in this beverage are, "12 oz Agua Carbonatada, Azucar, Sabor Artificial, Acido Citrico Benzoato de sodio. Color Amarillo FD&C No 6." (carbonated water, sugar, artificial flavoring, citric acid sodium benzoate, and color FD&C yellow no. 6).

The design on the bottle is representative of what the country looks like from a bird's eye view.

Advertising 
There was an advertisement that played in El Salvador that ties the beverage with being a Salvadorean. The video itself aired in 1984 and it shows people working in the fields, with animals, people carrying items, selling in a market, and making tortillas. The video ends by saying "Kolashanpan, el sabor de El Salvador."

Cultural Impacts 
According to a dissertation, Kolashanpan helps Salvadoreans maintain, "a transnational community identity as well as a salvadoreño(americano) ethnic identity." Brock says that, in Houston there are many Salvadoreans and Salvadorean-Americans and that keeping items such as sodas from their native country, they can more easily adjust to living in Houston, as well as keeping in touch with their native roots. On the company website, they have five distribution centers in, Texas, Connecticut, California, New York, and Florida.

References

Carbonated drinks